"Look Back at It" is a song by American rapper A Boogie wit da Hoodie, released as the lead single from his second studio album Hoodie SZN in December 2018. A version with South Korean singer Park Woo-jin of South Korean boy groups AB6IX and formerly Wanna One was made available online on December 6, 2018, a day before the regular version, while another version with German rapper Olexesh was released on February 20, 2019. It interpolates a sample from Michael Jackson's "Remember the Time" and "You Rock My World". The song was released to rhythmic radio in the United States.

Music video
The music video for the song was released on January 30, 2019 and filmed in Dekalb Academy of Technology and Environment. It is set in a high school and features a skit introduction with a cameo from the Backpack Kid. A Boogie wit da Hoodie said he set the video in a high school because he considers himself "a voice of the youth".

Chart performance
"Look Back at It" debuted at number 95 on the US Billboard Hot 100 chart on the week of December 22, 2018. The song continued to climb the chart for the next few weeks. The song eventually reached its peak position at number 27, eight weeks later on the week of February 16, 2019. The song became A Boogie's second highest-charting single to date, after "Numbers", which peaked at number 23. On April 4, 2019, the single was certified Platinum by the Recording Industry Association of America (RIAA) for sales of over 1,000,000 digital copies in the United States.

Charts

Weekly charts

Year-end charts

Certifications

References

2018 singles
2018 songs
A Boogie wit da Hoodie songs
Songs written by Christopher Dotson
Songs written by Fred Jerkins III
Songs written by LaShawn Daniels
Songs written by Boi-1da
Songs written by Michael Jackson
Songs written by Hitmaka
Song recordings produced by Yung Berg
Songs written by A Boogie wit da Hoodie